Lolme may refer to:

Jean-Louis de Lolme (1741-1804), Swiss political theorist
Lolme, Dordogne, a commune in the French département of Dordogne